Entephria nobiliaria is a moth of the family Geometridae first described by Gottlieb August Wilhelm Herrich-Schäffer in 1852. It is found from Scandinavia to Siberia and in the mountainous areas of Europe.

The wingspan is 26–33 mm. Adults are on wing in July.

The larvae feed on Saxifraga species, including Saxifraga oppositifolia. The species overwinters in the larval stage.

Subspecies
Entephria nobiliaria nobiliaria
Entephria nobiliaria borearia Prout, 1914

References

External links

Fauna Europaea
Lepiforum e.V.

Larentiini
Moths of Europe
Taxa named by Gottlieb August Wilhelm Herrich-Schäffer